Cubanola domingensis, or campanita, are small trees endemic to the Dominican Republic.

Biogeography and range
Cubanola dominguensis, also known as "campanita criolla", is an endemic plant of the Dominican Republic in the Caribbean. It usually grows in the north and the east region of the country, near the coast.

Key features
It is a perennial plant, which means that the plant lives for more than two years. Cubanola dominguensis grows in shrubs or small trees. It produces a white, tan, greenish flowers, and they usually blossom repeatedly. These are also fragrant flowers, they say they smell like warm chocolate. This plant can also be dangerous if ingested because it can be poisonous.

Description
Cubanola domingensis are shrubs or small trees up to 2 m in height with pendant, white flowers. Leaves with petioles 1–3 mm long, blades ovate or elliptic 6–12 cm long, 3.3–6 cm wide, acuminate or acute at apex, obtuse or acute at base. Calyx lobes 1.1-2.5 cm long, 1–2 mm wide. Corolla 18.5-19.8 long, tube 6.5–7 cm long, lobes 7–8 mm long. Fruit ellipsoid, 3-4.3 cm long, apex obtuse.

Ecology 
This plant usually grows in partial or full shade. This plant grows in limestone áreas and thus does well in alkaline soils.  Being fully tropical, it is cold sensitive. In subtropical areas such as South Florida, cold weather may cause the leaves and flowers to drop.

Distribution
They are endemic to the Dominican Republic, where they are found in the provinces of Puerto Plata, Santo Domingo,  San Pedro de Macorís, and La Altagracia.

Etymology
The species has been given the specific epithet "domingensis", as it occurs on the island of Hispaniola. This island was historically called Santo Domingo, or Saint-Domingue.

Taxonomy
First collect by J.N. Rose in 1913 near Santo Domingo, they were published as Portlandia domingensis by Nathaniel Lord Britton in 1914.  Later, Annette Aiello moved these to a new genera, Cubanola, in her 1979 doctoral thesis A reexamination of Portlandia (Rubiaceae) and associated taxa.

Uses
Cubanola domingensis is cultivated as an ornamental.

References

Chiococceae
Endemic flora of the Dominican Republic
Plants described in 1914